''Haplochromis'' sp. 'Kyoga flameback' is a species of fish in the family Cichlidae. It is endemic to the Lake Kyoga system in Uganda.

References

Haplochromis
Endemic freshwater fish of Uganda
Undescribed vertebrate species
Taxonomy articles created by Polbot